The Melkite Patriarchal Dependent Territory of Egypt, Sudan, and South Sudan is the presence of the Melkite Greek Catholic Church in the Northern African countries of Egypt, Sudan, and South Sudan.

References

External links 
 Site of the Melkite Greek Catholic Patriarchate of Antioch

Roman Catholic dioceses in Egypt
Melkite Greek Catholic Church in Egypt
Melkite Greek Catholic eparchies